Kyaswa was a Burmese royal title. 

It may mean:

 Kyaswa:  King of Pagan (r. 1235−51)
 Kyaswa of Sagaing:  King of Sagaing (r. 1339−49)
 Kyaswa of Prome:  Viceroy of Prome (r.  1305−44)

Burmese royal titles